Josef Stein (2 February 1876 – 16 June 1937) was an Austrian film director and producer. He contributed to more than thirty films from 1917 to 1937.

Selected filmography

References

External links 

1876 births
1937 deaths
Austrian film directors
Austrian film producers